Daniil Aleksandrovich Kornyushin (born 8 October 2001) is a Russian football player who plays for FC Pari Nizhny Novgorod. He plays as a right back or left back.

Club career
He made his debut in the Russian Football National League for FC Volgar Astrakhan on 8 August 2020 in a game against FC Baltika Kaliningrad, he substituted Andrei Zenin in the 70th minute.

He made his debut in the Russian Premier League for FC Krasnodar on 15 August 2021 in a game against FC Arsenal Tula, he started and played a complete game.

On 30 June 2022, Kornyushin signed a three-year contract with FC Pari Nizhny Novgorod.

Career statistics

References

External links
 
 Profile by Russian Football National League
 

2001 births
Sportspeople from Stavropol
Living people
Russian footballers
Association football defenders
FC Krasnodar-2 players
FC Krasnodar players
FC Volgar Astrakhan players
FC Nizhny Novgorod (2015) players
Russian Premier League players
Russian First League players
Russian Second League players